Vandithavalam is a village in the Palakkad district, state of Kerala, India. It is among the villages administered by the Perumatty Gram Panchayat.

Vandithavalam was a village in the erstwhile Cochin state, but was included in the Palakkad district at the time of the Kerala State formation.

Vandithavalam lies in the foothills of the Western Ghats and is situated near the Parambikulam Wildlife Sanctuary. Vandithavalam is nourished by the Bharathapuzha River and consists of fertile agricultural land.

Vandithavalam is situated in the Palghat Gap, thus historically transport from neighbouring Tamil Nadu is constant. Vandithavalam served as a resting point for the travellers and thus derived the name Vandithavalam, with Vandi meaning vehicle and Thavalam referring to a centre/place in Malayalam.

Vandithavalam is situated 17 Km away from the Palakkad City and 30 Km away from Pollachi town.

Demographics
 India census, Vandithavalam had a population of 12,160 with 6,006 males and 6,154 females.

References

Vandithavalam